The 2017 Malaysia FA Cup Final was the 28th final of the Malaysia FA Cup, the Malaysia football cup competition. Kedah won the cup after defeating Pahang 3–2 and were assured a place for the 2018 AFC Cup group stage.

Background 
The final was played on 20 May 2017 at Shah Alam Stadium.

Route to the final

Pahang

Kedah

Ticket allocation 
Each club received an allocation of 72,000 tickets; 32,750 tickets for Pahang, 32,750 tickets for Kedah and 6,500 tickets for purchase online.

Rules
The final was played as a single match. If tied after regulation, extra time and, if necessary, penalty shoot-out would be used to decide the winner.

Match

Details

References

Final
FA Final